The annual Car of the Year Japan Award (日本カー・オブ・ザ・イヤー, nihon kā obu za iyā), also known as Japan Car of the Year (or JCOTY), is an annual Car of the Year award given for newly released or redesigned vehicles released in the car buying market in Japan in the twelve months beginning 1 November.

The award has been presented since 1980. The current recipient of the award for 2022 to 2023 is the Nissan Sakura/Mitsubishi eK X EV.

The first non-Japanese car to win the award was the Volkswagen Golf in 2013, followed by the Volvo XC60 in 2017 and the Volvo XC40 in 2018. The highest-placed car from the United States was the Jeep Cherokee, which was eliminated in the final round in 2014 and was placed eighth. The supervisory board is made up primarily of Japanese automotive journalists.

The award is not associated with the more recent Automotive Researchers’ and Journalists’ Conference (RJC) RJC Car of the Year Award, which has been issued since 1992.

Recipients

Most wins by manufacturer

See also
 List of motor vehicle awards

References

External links
 Official Website

Japanese science and technology awards
Japan